Raphitoma laviae is a species of sea snail, a marine gastropod mollusc in the family Raphitomidae.

Description
The length of the shell varies between 5 mm and 15 mm. The protoconch is multispiral.

(Original description) The reddish-brown shell has an oblong-fusiform shape. The six whorls show about 20 pronounced axial ribs, crossed by transverse riblets (about 5 in the upper whorls) forming a latticed structure. The aperture is oblong and is somewhat smaller than half the length of the shell. The outer lip is incrassate and notched within.

Distribution
This species occurs in the Western and Central Mediterranean Sea.

References

 Giannuzzi-Savelli R., Pusateri F. & Bartolini S. (2018). A revision of the Mediterranean Raphitomidae (Gastropoda: Conoidea) 5: loss of planktotrophy and pairs of species, with the description of four new species. Bollettino Malacologico. 54, supplement 11: 1-77
 Hoarau A. & Horst D. (2020). Les genres Cyrillia, Leufroyia & Raphitoma vivants de Méditerranée française. AFC, Paris, and ConchBooks, Hackenheim, 98 pp.

External links
 Philippi R.A. (1844) - Bemerkungen über die Molluskenfauna Unter-Italiens; Archiv für Naturgeschichte. vol. 10 (1)
 
 Gastropods.com: Raphitoma laviae
 Biolib.cz: Raphitoma laviae
 Natural History Museum, Rotterdam: Raphitoma laviae
 Russini, V.; Giannuzzi-Savelli, R.; Pusateri, F.; Prkic, J.; Fassio, G.; Modica, M. V.; Oliverio, M. (2020). Candidate cases of poecilogony in Neogastropoda: implications for the systematics of the genus Raphitoma Bellardi, 1847. Invertebrate Systematics. 34: 293–318

laviae
Gastropods described in 1844